The Battle of Turnberry was a battle fought in February 1307 during the Scottish Wars of Independence near Turnberry, Ayrshire, Scotland.

King Robert I of Scotland's invasion of his ancestral lands in Annandale and Carrick began in 1307. The Carrick invasion force was led by Robert, his brother Edward de Brus, James Douglas, Lord of Douglas and Robert Boyd. The force comprised thirty three galleys. They sailed to Turnberry and landed near Turnberry Castle. The invasion force quickly overwhelmed the English forces of Henry de Percy, 1st Baron Percy encamped around Turnberry Castle, but failed to take the castle.

Henry de Percy was forced to leave the castle after this defeat.

References
Barbour, John, The Bruce, trans. A. A. H. Douglas, 1964.
Sir Herbert Maxwell, The Chronicle of Lanercost, 1272-1346: translated with notes (1913).

Battles of the Wars of Scottish Independence
History of South Ayrshire
1307 in Scotland
Conflicts in 1307
Battles between England and Scotland
1307 in England